Gibberula benguelensis is a species of sea snail, a marine gastropod mollusk, in the family Cystiscidae.

Distribution
This species occurs in the Southern Atlantic off Benguela, Angola.

References

External links
 MNHN, Paris: syntype
 Jousseaume F. (1875). Coquilles de la famille des marginelles. Monographie. Revue et Magazin de Zoologie. ser. 3, 3: 164-271; 429-435

Endemic fauna of Angola
benguelensis
Gastropods described in 1875